Vehicle registration plates of Kuwait started in 1950. The current version started in 2008.

4-71841

References 

Transport in Kuwait
Kuwait
Kuwait transport-related lists